Alfonso Cabeza de Vaca y Leighton, 11th Marquess of Portago, GE (11 October 1928 – 12 May 1957), best known as Alfonso de Portago, was a Spanish aristocrat, racing and bobsleigh driver, jockey and pilot. 

Born in London to a prominent family in the peerage of Spain, he was named after his godfather, king Alfonso XIII. His grandfather, the 9th Marquess of Portago had been Mayor of Madrid while his father, who was President of Puerta de Hierro and a prolific golfer, died of a heart attack while showering after a polo match. His mother, Olga Leighton, was an Irish nurse. 

At age 17, Portago began displaying his flamboyant lifestyle by winning a $500 bet after flying a borrowed plane under London Tower Bridge. He twice rode the Grand National as "gentleman rider" and formed the first Spanish bobsleigh team with his cousins, finishing 4th in the 1956 Winter Olympics, shaving the bronze medal by 0.14 seconds.

In 1953, he was introduced into the Scuderia Ferrari team, competing at the Carrera Panamericana, 1000 km Buenos Aires and several Grand Prix, including a win and second place at the 1956 Tour de France Automobile and 1956 British Grand Prix respectively.

His promising career was cut short in May 1957 after his renowned Ferrari 335 S crashed near the village of Guidizzolo when a tyre burst while driving along a dead straight road at 150mph at the Mille Miglia, killing both himself and his navigator and 9 spectators. The young age of the marquess who was 28 at the time of his death combined with his status as a sex symbol caused a shock amongst many, having several tributes and landmarks named after him, most notably the "Portago curve" at Jarama racetrack.

The Marquess of Portago was seen by many as a true playboy of his time; "a tall, handsome and wealthy Spanish aristocrat who captured everybody's imagination". Gregor Grant famously said of him: "a man like Portago appears only once in a generation, and it would probably be more accurate to say only once in a lifetime. The fellow does everything fabulously well. Never mind the driving, the steeplechasing, the bobsledding, the athletic side of things, never mind being fluent in 4 languages. (...) He could be the best bridge player in the world if he cared to try, he could certainly be a great soldier, and I suspect he could be a fine writer".

Biography

Early life

Portago was born in London, he was educated at Biarritz, in France. He became articulate in four languages, and spoke English with a distinctive British accent. Portago was heir to one of the most respected titles in Spain and a millionaire. Among his ancestors were explorer Álvar Núñez Cabeza de Vaca. His father was Antonio Cabeza de Vaca, 10th Marquess of Portago, who died during half time at a polo match at a young age. His paternal grandfather was Vicente Cabeza de Vaca, 9th Marquess of Portago, mayor of Madrid. His mother was named Olga Leighton and was an Irish nurse.  She also had a daughter named Sol, for Soledad, who married and became known as the Marchioness of Moratalla in racing circles. She died in 2017. Olga's first husband,  Frank Mackey was more than 40 years older than she was.  He shot himself while terminally ill and left Olga an enormous fortune made as founder of Household Finance Corp. Portago was a first cousin of Vicente Sartorius, 4th Marquess of Mariño as well as José Luis de Vilallonga, 9th Marquess of Castellbell.

Portago was dark-haired and had freckles and blue eyes. He was 1.83 m (6 ft) tall and weighed 77 kg (170 Ibs). He famously won a bet at the age of 17 when he flew his plane beneath London Tower Bridge. He participated twice in the Grand National Steeplechase at Aintree as a gentleman jockey, although he found keeping his weight down to be a struggle.

Race car driver

Portago began racing sports cars in 1953 after his meeting with the Ferrari importer in the USA, Luigi Chinetti, who asked him to be his co-driver in the Carrera Panamericana. He later raced alone in a personal Ferrari Sport model at the 1954 1000 km Buenos Aires. Portago won six major races, including the Tour de France automobile race, the Grand Prix of Oporto, and the Nassau Governor's Cup (twice).  In Nassau, during the winter of 1956, Portago trailed the car ahead of him by centimeters while travelling at 240 km/h. Portago used his skill to avert careening into a crowd after the driver ahead of him touched his brakes and both cars went into a 180 m skid. Among sports car enthusiasts, Portago was known as a two-car man, because of the many burned-out brakes, clutches, transmissions, and wrecked cars for which he was responsible. He often needed several cars to finish a race.

He participated in 5 World Championship Formula One Grands Prix, debuting on 1 July 1956.  His best result was a second place at the 1956 British Grand Prix (a shared drive with Peter Collins), and scored a total of four championship points. In 1953 he raced with Chinetti in the Carrera Panamericana. During the 1955 British Grand Prix at Silverstone, Portago was thrown from his Ferrari while racing at 140 km/h after losing control on a patch of oil. He was hospitalized with a broken leg.

Bobsleigh

He also was a bobsleigh runner, recruiting several cousins in order to form Spain's first bobsleigh team for the 1956 Winter Olympic Games in Cortina d'Ampezzo. He had had only two or three practice runs in Switzerland before buying a pair of sleds. With Portago steering, the two-man bob finished fourth to the surprise of the traditional teams, missing out on a medal by 0.16 seconds. He was introduced to bobsledding by an American from Beloit, Wisconsin, Edmund Nelson, whom he later teamed up with in order to win the Tour de France automobile race.

Portago also won a bronze medal in the two-man event at the 1957 FIBT World Championships in St. Moritz.

Death

He and his co-driver Edmund Nelson were killed on 12 May 1957 in a crash during that year's Mille Miglia, in a straight road section between Cerlongo and Guidizzolo, in the communal territory of Cavriana about 70 km from Brescia, the start and finish point of the event race. The wreck also claimed the lives of nine spectators, among them five children. Portago was apprehensive about competing in the Mille Miglia, a race he considered too dangerous to be run, as he was concerned about the almost complete impossibility about knowing every corner (even with a navigator) and every possible road condition over 1,000 mi (1,600 km) of open public roads with very limited information on what to expect in the race. A tire blew on Portago's third-place Ferrari 335 S causing it to spin into the crowd lining the highway. He was travelling at  when the tire went flat. The 335 hurtled over a canal on the left side of the road,  then veered back across the canal,  causing the deaths of nine onlookers in total. Two of the dead children were hit by a concrete highway milestone that was ripped from the ground by Portago's car and thrown into the crowd. The bodies of Portago and Nelson were badly disfigured beneath the Ferrari, which was upside down. Portago's body was in two sections. A photograph dubbed "The Kiss of Death" shows actress Linda Christian kissing Portago at a stop just before his fatal crash.

As T.C. Browne wrote, "The inevitable happened when Alfonso [...] de Portago stopped alongside the course, ran to the fence, kissed Linda Christian, ran back to his Ferrari and drove on to his destiny, killing himself, his co-driver, 10 spectators, and the Mille Miglia".

Once Portago commented, "I won't die in an accident. I'll die of old age or be executed in some gross miscarriage of justice". Nelson countered this assertion, saying Portago would not live to be 30. According to Nelson, "every time Portago comes in from a race the front of his car is wrinkled where he has been nudging people out of the way at 130 mph (210 km/h)".

Legacy

The Portago curve at the St. Moritz-Celerina Olympic Bobrun is named in his honor for his foundation's efforts to renovate the lower portion of the track. A Portago curve (#9) is also shown on the Jarama motor racing circuit in Spain.

Personal life
In 1949, when he was only twenty, Portago married American former model Carroll McDaniel (by whom he had two children). McDaniel was several years older than Portago and they barely knew each other. She subsequently married the philanthropist Milton Petrie. One of Portago's daughters is photographer Andrea Portago, who was on the June 1977 cover of Andy Warhol's Interview magazine.  His son, Anthony (1954-1990), was a stockbroker born around 1954. He married in 1973 (and divorced in 1978) Sorbonne-educated society fundraiser and costume- and set-designer Barbara, daughter of German nobleman Henrik von Schlubach, partner in Schlubach Exporting and Importing Company in Hamburg, and ex-wife Florence Van der Kemp (née Harris), president of the Versailles-Claude Monet Foundation in New York and daughter of the late Rear Admiral Frederic R. Harris, of Washington and New York. Her stepfather, Gérald van der Kemp, was a curator who restored the Palace of Versailles. Barbara de Portago subsequently married, in 1984, actor and playwright Jason Harrison Grant, and, after their divorce, married in 1991 (divorced 1994) investment banker William James Tapert.

Supposedly, Carroll McDaniel and Alfonso de Portago were in the process of getting a divorce so he could legitimize his invalid Mexican marriage to fashion model Dorian Leigh (who had already aborted their first baby in 1954 and then gave birth to their son Kim on 27 September 1955). Leigh was eleven years his senior.  However, Portago was also dating actress Linda Christian, actor Tyrone Power's ex-wife.

Complete Formula One World Championship results 
(key) 

† Indicates shared drive with Peter Collins
* Indicates shared drive with José Froilán González

Titles
 11th Marquess of Portago
 Grandee of Spain
 13th Count of la Mejorada

Heraldry

In popular culture

Film
Brazilian actor Gabriel Leone has been cast as Portago in the upcoming biopic Ferrari (2023).

See also
Scuderia Ferrari

References

Bibliography

External links 

 The memorial at the site of the accident near Guidizzolo
 Sketch of the accident from the journal L'Automobile 19 May 1957
Bobsleigh two-man world championship medalists since 1931

1928 births
1957 deaths
Sportspeople from London
Spanish male bobsledders
Spanish male equestrians
Spanish racing drivers
Spanish Formula One drivers
Bobsledders at the 1956 Winter Olympics
Olympic bobsledders of Spain
Ferrari Formula One drivers
Racing drivers who died while racing
Sport deaths in Italy
24 Hours of Le Mans drivers
Spanish people of Irish descent
World Sportscar Championship drivers
Grandees of Spain
Carrera Panamericana drivers
Spanish nobility